The 2011 San Diego Toreros football team represented the University of San Diego in the 2011 NCAA Division I FCS football season. The Toreros were led by fifth-year head coach Ron Caragher and played their home games at Torero Stadium. They are a member of the Pioneer Football League. They finished the season 9–2, 7–1 in PFL play to claim a share of the conference championship with Drake.

Schedule

References

San Diego
San Diego Toreros football seasons
Pioneer Football League champion seasons
San Diego Toreros football